Eduardo Blasco Ferrer (Barcelona, 1956 – Bastia, 12 January 2017) was a Spanish-Italian linguist and a professor at the University of Cagliari, Sardinia.  He is best known as the author of several studies about the Paleo-Sardinian and Sardinian language.

Books
Grammatica storica del catalano e dei suoi dialetti con speciale riguardo all'algherese. Tübingen: G. Narr, c1984.
La lingua sarda contemporanea : grammatica del logudorese e del campidanese : norma e varietà dell'uso : sintesi storica. Cagliari : Della Torre, c1986.
Storia linguistica della Sardegna. Tübingen : Niemeyer, 1984.
Le parlate dell'alta Ogliastra : analisi dialettologica : saggio di storia linguistica e culturale. Cagliari : Edizioni Della Torre, 1988.
Ello, ellus : grammatica sarda. Nuoro : Poliedro, c1994.
La lingua nel tempo : variazione e cambiamento in latino, italiano e sardo. Cagliari : CUEC, 1995.
 Cagliari : CUEC, 1996.
Pro domo : grammatica essenziale della lingua sarda. Cagliari : Condaghes, 1998.
Italiano e tedesco : un confronto linguistico. Torino : Paravia scriptorium, c1999.
Italiano, sardo e lingue moderne a scuola. Milano : F. Angeli, 2003.
Storia della lingua sarda. Cagliari : CUEC, 2009.
Paleosardo. Le radici linguistiche della Sardegna neolitica.   Berlin : De Gruyter, 2010.

References

1956 births
2017 deaths
People from Barcelona
Linguists from Spain
Linguists from Italy